A spigot (or "tap" or "faucet") is a valve for controlling the release of a gas or liquid.

Spigot may also refer to:
 AT-4 Spigot, NATO reporting name for 9K111 Fagot, a Russian anti-tank missile
 Spigot, the male end of a pipe designed to be connected with a spigot and socket joint
 Spigot, a keyed post in the center of some vacuum tube bases
 Spigot, an individual projecting microscopic tube in a spider's spinneret
 Spigot, the nickname of cartoonist Tristan A. Farnon
 Spigot Peak, a mountain in Antarctica
"Spigot", a song by Marc Ribot from Shrek

See also
 
 Spigot algorithm, in mathematics
 Spigot mortar, an artillery weapon